Kermia harenula is a species of sea snail, a marine gastropod mollusk in the family Raphitomidae.

Description
The length of the shell attains 4 mm, its diameter 1.7 mm.

(Original description) The small, solid shell is ovate-fusiform, rather turreted and constricted at the base. Its colour is white, the protoconch buff. On the upper whorls an orange line runs along the second spiral below the angle. On the body whorl such lines follow the third, seventh, and tenth spirals. On the back of the body whorl there may be an irregular orange blotch. The shell contains seven whorls, of which 3½ compose the protoconch.

Sculpture: A subsutural space representing the fasciole is smooth save for radial wrinkles. The radial ribs are perpendicular and discontinuous, absent on base and fasciole, set at about fourteen to a whorl, and chiefly discernible as knots
on the spirals. On the body whorl the spirals amount to fifteen, on the penultimate to six, and on the antepenultimate to four sharp elevated cords.

Aperture :—The varix is moderately prominent, and mounts considerably on the penultimate. The inner edge of the outer lip is beset with ten small crowded denticules. The sinus is spout shaped, constricted at its entrance. The columella terminates anteriorly, and within is a small but distinct tooth.

Distribution
This marine species occurs in the Gulf of Carpentaria to Queensland, Australia

References

 Powell, A.W.B. 1966. The molluscan families Speightiidae and Turridae, an evaluation of the valid taxa, both Recent and fossil, with list of characteristic species. Bulletin of the Auckland Institute and Museum. Auckland, New Zealand 5: 1–184, pls 1–23

External links
 Tröndlé, J. E. A. N., and Michel Boutet. "Inventory of marine molluscs of French Polynesia." Atoll Research Bulletin (2009)
 
 Gastropods.com: kermia harenula

harenula
Gastropods described in 1922